Halil Şafak Bakkalbaşıoğlu (born 29 May 1964) is a Turkish television director, television producer, documentary producer and film director.

Career 
In 1985 Bakkalbaşıoğlu graduated from the Department of Radio and TV at Ankara University's Faculty of Communications and Media. During the second year of the course he started to work at Turkish Radio and Television Institution (TRT). Beginning as a scriptwriter, Bakkalbaşıoğlu continued his career as a director and producer until 1992. During this period at TRT, he produced programs including Lafı Güzaf (Verbiage in English), a dramatic documentary; Edebiyat Üçlemesi (Literature Trilogy), a dramatic documentary; Prensesin Böylesi (That Kind of a Princess), a drama; and Ondan Sonra (After That), a magazine program.

Bakkalbaşıoğlu transferred to ATV in 1992 until 1997 and produced several broadcasts during this time, including A Takımı, Televizyon Çocuğu, Zaga and Siyaset Meydanı. He is a founding member of Guild of TV and Cinema Producers (TESİYAP). His productions featured many actors who later became stars.

Bakkalbaşıoğlu served as the Executive Broadcasting Director of Star TV, Executive Broadcasting Director of MTV Turkey and Visual Arts Director of Bloomberg HT between 2004 – 2009. He produced programmes in several TV formatsboth local and international – including one-night specials, documentaries, and video clips.

After releasing the documentaries Mahzuni Şerif (2005) and Türkiye’nin Ruhu: Cemil Meriç (2008), his documentary İnkılap ve Dokuz Kardeş  (İnkılap and Her Nine Sisters) was screened at the 28th International Istanbul Film Festival and was well received. Recently, he was the General Coordinator of the Sanayi Savaşları (Industry Wars) documentary, broadcast on TRT Documentary.

Bakkalbaşıoğlu directed the Jean-Michel Jarre Tour 2010 İstanbul Concert, Cirque Du Soleil İstanbul, and the 2010 FIBA World Championship Grand Opening Night, and is continuing his work with BBO Productions, as well as the Visual Arts Director and Project Consultant to Red Arrow Turkey – Karga Seven Pictures.

In addition to lecturing at Bahcesehir University between 2006 and 2012, Bakkalbaşıoğlu was a lecturer at Istanbul Bilgi University since 2002.

TV shows

One-night specials

Advertisements

Promotional films

Documentaries

Music videos

Awards

References 

Turkish directors
Turkish producers
Television people from Istanbul
1964 births
21st-century Turkish people
Turkish television producers
Golden Butterfly Award winners
Living people